John Edward Hardwick (3 June 1867 – 5 August 1943) was an Australian businessman and politician who was a member of the Legislative Assembly of Western Australia from 1904 to 1911 and again from 1914 to 1921. He represented the seat of East Perth on both occasions.

Early life
Hardwick was born in Perth to Margaret (née McGuiness) and John Hardwick. As a youth, he was a talented player of Australian rules football, spending seven seasons in the West Australian Football Association (WAFA). This included 16 games for West Australians (1887–1888), 15 games for Metropolitans (1889–1890), and 37 games for West Perth (1891–1893). Hardwick left Perth to work in York as a bootmaker and saddler, and then in 1894 went to the Eastern Goldfields, running a business in Coolgardie with his brother. He served as a Municipality of Coolgardie councillor from 1900 to 1901. He then returned to Perth, and was a member of the Perth City Council from 1901 to 1904.

Politics
Hardwick entered parliament at the 1904 East Perth by-election, caused by the resignation of the premier, Walter James. He was re-elected at the 1905 and 1908 state elections, and had intended to stand again in 1911, but made a mistake in submitting his nomination and was thus unable to be listed on the ballot. His seat was won by Labor's Titus Lander. Hardwick reclaimed East Perth at the 1914 election, standing for the Liberal Party. He was re-elected at the 1917 election for the newly formed Nationalist Party, but at the 1921 election lost his seat to Labor's Jack Simons. He failed to even make the final two-candidate-preferred count. Hardwick made one final run for parliament at the 1922 Legislative Council elections, but lost to James Macfarlane.

Later life
After leaving politics, Hardwick managed hotels at Dwellingup and Bolgart for periods. He died in Kalgoorlie in 1943, aged 76. He had married Esther Davis in 1895, with whom he had seven children, and was widowed in 1934.

References

1867 births
1943 deaths
Australian rules footballers from Western Australia
Members of the Western Australian Legislative Assembly
Nationalist Party of Australia members of the Parliament of Western Australia
Politicians from Perth, Western Australia
Western Australian local councillors
West Perth Football Club players
Australian businesspeople